The Wellman Apartments in Boise, Idaho, United States, is a 2-story, Georgian Revival building designed by Tourtellotte & Hummel and constructed by local contractor J.O. Jordan in 1929. The building included 16 "efficiency" apartments that featured a Murphy bed, kitchenette, dressing room, and bathroom. Soon after the building opened, it was remodeled, although the exterior remains nearly unaltered. The building was added to the National Register of Historic Places in 1982.

The Wellman Apartments building was constructed and named for Walter and Ora Wellman, Eastern Oregon ranchers, in 1929. The Dollard Agency, a Boise insurance and real estate firm, may have been involved with the project. Soon after the building opened, the Wellmans sold it to Charles Genoway and Joseph Dollard. In 1931 the Dollard Agency renovated the building, including installation of tile in bathrooms and construction of two apartments in the basement garage. In 1932 the owners installed a ventilation system.

References

External links

		
Colonial Revival architecture in Idaho
Buildings and structures completed in 1929
National Register of Historic Places in Boise, Idaho
Apartment buildings in Boise, Idaho
Apartment buildings on the National Register of Historic Places in Idaho